Ávila is a city of Spain located in the autonomous community of Castile and León. It is the capital and most populated municipality of the Province of Ávila.

It lies on the right bank of the Adaja river. Located more than 1,130 m above sea level, the city is the highest provincial capital in Spain.

Distinctly known by its medieval walls, Ávila is sometimes called the Town of Stones and Saints, and it claims that it is one of the towns with the highest number of Romanesque and Gothic churches per capita in Spain. It has complete and prominent medieval town walls, built in the Romanesque style; writer José Martínez Ruiz, in his book El alma castellana ("The Castilian Soul"), described it as "perhaps the most 16th-century town in Spain". The town is also known as Ávila de los Caballeros, Ávila del Rey and Ávila de los Leales ("Ávila of the knights", "Ávila of the king", "Ávila of the loyal ones"), each of these epithets being present in the town standard.

Orson Welles once named Ávila as the place in which he would most desire to live, calling it a "strange, tragic place". Various scenes of his 1965 film Chimes at Midnight were filmed in the town.

Ávila was declared a UNESCO World Heritage Site in 1985. The site originally consisted of the walled city and four extra muros churches. The number of churches included in the site has since been increased.

Geography
Situated 1132 metres (3714 feet) above sea level on a rocky outcrop on the right bank of the Adaja river, a tributary of the Duero, Ávila is the highest provincial capital in Spain. It is built on the flat summit of a rocky hill, which rises abruptly in the midst of a veritable wilderness; a brown, arid, treeless table-land, strewn with immense grey boulders, and shut in by lofty mountains.

Climate
Ávila's position results in a temperate Mediterranean climate (Csb, according to the Köppen climate classification), with warm summers and chilly winters with snowfalls, bordering on a cold semi-arid climate (BSk). Annual rainfall is low compared to surrounding areas, implying that it lies in a rain shadow. The Adaja is dry for several months of the year and the town has historically had water supply problems. Ávila has the coldest winter low temperatures of the Spanish provincial capital cities, thanks to its high altitude ( above sea level).

History
In pre-Roman times (the 5th century BC), Ávila was inhabited by the Vettones, who called it Obila (Ὀβίλα) ("High Mountain") and built one of their strongest fortresses here. There are Bronze Age stone statues of boars (known as verracio) nearby.

Ávila may have been the ancient town known as Abula, mentioned by Ptolemy in his Geographia (II 6, 60) as being located in the Iberian region of Bastetania. Abula is mentioned as one of the first towns in Hispania that was converted to Christianity by Secundus of Abula (San Segundo), however, Abula may alternatively have been the town of Abla.

After the conquest by ancient Rome, the town was called Abila or Abela. The plan of the town remains typically Roman; rectangular in shape, with its two main streets (cardo and decumanus) intersecting at a forum in the centre.  Roman remains that are embedded in town walls at the eastern and southern entrances (now the Alcazar and Rastro Gates) appear to have been ashlar altar stones.

By tradition, in the 1st century, Secundus, having travelled via the Roman province of Hispania Baetica, brought the Gospel to Ávila, and was created its first bishop.

After the fall of the Western Roman Empire, Ávila became a stronghold of the Visigoths. Conquered by the Moors (Arabs) (who called it Ābila, آبلة), it was repeatedly attacked by the northern Iberian Christian kingdoms, becoming a virtually uninhabited no man's land. It was repopulated about 1088 following the definitive reconquest of the area by Raymond of Burgundy, son in law of Alfonso VI of León and Castile. He employed two foreigners, Casandro Romano and Florin de Pituenga, to construct a stone frontier town and creating the walls that still stand.

The city achieved a period of prosperity under the Catholic Monarchs in the early 16th century.

The Junta of Ávila drafted the Proyecto de Ley Perpetua (a sort of proto-constitutional draft that never got to enter into force) in the Cathedral of Ávila in the Summer of 1520, envisaging that cities assembled every three years without the requirement for royal sanction or presence, determining taxation and acting as a check and balance on government activity.

The city experienced a long decline since the 17th century, its population reducing to just 4,000 inhabitants.

In the 19th century, there was some population growth with the construction of the railway line from Madrid to the French border at Irun and an important junction near the town.

In 1936, at the outbreak of the Spanish Civil War, the town quickly became part of the area occupied by rebel troops. Growth continued slowly again under Franco, but Ávila has not had a major influence in Spanish society in recent history, apart from the nurturing of politicians such as Adolfo Suárez, the first democratically elected prime minister of Spain post-Franco, and José María Aznar, prime minister from 1996 to 2004, who represented Ávila in the Cortes but was not from the town.

Architecture

The Walls of Ávila

The main landmark in the city is the imposing Walls of Ávila (11th–14th centuries), begun in 1090.

The walls represent the largest fully illuminated monument in the world. It is possible to walk upon the walls for roughly half their circumference. While some of the walls will never be walkable because of their integration into other structures, a large stretch has yet to be made safe for pedestrians.

Cathedral

The construction of the iron-grey granite Gothic Cathedral of Ávila is said to have commenced in 1107 under Alvar Garcia de Estrella. Other historians believe the cathedral to be the work of the master mason Fruchel in the 12th century, coinciding with the repopulation of the town led by Raymond of Burgundy. The eastern apse, which forms part of the town walls, is half church, half fortress, and it was here that the loyal citizens elevated Alonso VII as their king, hence Ávila del Rey. The transept was finished in 1350 by Bishop Sancho de Ávila. The earlier Romanesque parts are made of a striking red-and-white "blood" limestone, while the Gothic parts were built with pure white stone.
 Northern façade: Gothic style at left and added renaissance at right. Porch of the Apostles.
 Western front: Burgundian style, with two towers forming a covered portal.
 Interior: Latin cross with three naves, a crossing and ambulatory.
 Capilla Mayor: Features a monumental altarpiece by Pedro Berruguete.
 Chapel of San Segundo, the first bishop: Attached to a column of the cruise. Renaissance style.
 Chapel of Santa Catalina: Made of alabaster.
 Choir and Rood screen: Renaissance style, decorated with reliefs depicting scenes of saints, carved from limestone. The alabaster tomb of Alonso Tostado de Madrigal, bishop in 1499, shown in the act of writing is in the ambulatory: "so enlightened were his doctrines that they caused the blind to see".
 Cloister: Access from the Romanesque cathedral by a door on the south aisle. Gothic style.

Basílica de San Vicente

 Construction began in the 12th century and lasted until the 14th century. Its design is attributed to the French master Giral Fruchel, the author himself from the cathedral and pioneer of the Gothic style in Spain.
 The overall structure is similar to the Latin basilicas. It has a Latin cross plan, three naves, dome, tribunes, three apses, atrium, two towers, and crypt.
 All the façade and the environment where it is located are of great artistic value.
 Interior: Latin cross room with three naves. The pillars are of a Greek cross with half columns on the heads.
 Crypt: Consists of three chapels, for the three apses of the church are mainly romanesque and have the best capitals of the monument.

Highlight the tomb of Saint Peter of the Boat and, above all, the Cenotaph of the Holy Brothers Martyrs, the head of the temple, Saint Vincent of Ávila, and her sisters, along with the torture he suffered in the 4th century, Saint Sabina and Saint Cristeta, (Cenotafio de los santos Vicente, Sabina y Cristeta), one of the most important works of Romanesque sculpture in Spain.

Convento de San José

The Convent of Saint Joseph is the first monastery of Discalced Carmelite nuns founded by Saint Teresa of Jesus. The convent was built in the year of 1562, although the most important architectural element, the church, was built in 1607. The church was designed by the architect Francisco de Mora (1553–1610). It has been designated a national monument since 1968.

Iglesia de San Pedro

 Start date: about 1100.
 The church of Saint Peter is located outside the town walls in the Plaza de Mercado Grande at the door of the Alcazar. Presents analogous with that of San Vicente.
 Latin cross floor and three naves of five sections. Apsidal chapels: mayor chapel, chapel of the south apse and chapel of the north apse.

Ermita de San Segundo

A hermitage located to the west of Ávila, outside the town walls, on the right bank of the Adaja river. Highlights the sculpted capitals in which the sculptor is the footprint of the apse of San Andrés. Alabaster statue made by Juan de Juni. Popular belief has it that, on introducing a handkerchief into the tomb and asking for three wishes, the saint will grant one. His pilgrimage is celebrated on 2 May, Segundo being the patron saint of Ávila.

Palacio de Don Diego del Águila
This 16th-century palace is located inside the walls and attached to it as junt walk through the door of San Vicente, defended the access of Muslim troops. Located on a busy street by different arms of the Águila family.

Real Monasterio de Santo Tomás
Real Monasterio de Santo Tomás is a Dominican convent of the late 15th century. Despite being away from the historic centre, it is one of the most important monuments of the town.

Santuario de Nuestra Señora de Sonsoles

This sanctuary is located 6 km from the capital in a picturesque area, and has a restaurant, hostel, picnic areas, and playgrounds.

There is located the statue of the Virgin of Sonsoles, co-patroness of Ávila, and patroness of the fields in the province.

It is tradition in this town to make pilgrimage to the sanctuary, making a wish to the Virgin, and to get to the door barefoot until you enter the church.

Secular architecture
Notable examples of secular architecture are the Valderrábanos Palace (15th century), the Casa de los Deanes (16th century), the Torreón de los Guzmanes and the Verdugos Palace (15th–16th centuries).

Conference and Exhibition Centre Lienzo Norte

 In mid-2007, work began on the convention centre. In April 2009, its construction was completed and it opened its doors.
 The building, designed by architect Francisco José Mangado, is modern in style.
 There is a large symphony hall, large glass galleries, café, restaurant, conference room, catering services, storage, reception, store room, etc.
 The symphony hall has a capacity of 2,000 and the secondary hall of 500. The two conference rooms have each 1,000 seats.

Museums and sights

 Museum of Ávila
 Museum of la Encarnación
 Museum of Santa Teresa
 Museum of the Cathedral
 Museo of Santo Tomás
 Museum of Oriental Art
 Museum of Natural Sciences
 Living Water
 Hall of Torreón de los Guzmanes
 Sala de la Diputación
 Sala del Episcopio
 Caprotti Museum (which houses the work of Italian painter Guido Caprotti (1887–1966), based in Ávila from 1916)

Universities

Ávila has two universities: the Catholic University of Ávila (UCAV) and the University of Mysticism, which became operational on September 2, 2008. There are three colleges of the University of Salamanca (USAL): the Polytechnic School of Ávila, the College of Education and Tourism in Ávila, and the School of Nursing.

Sports venues

 Town Sport: swimming Pool, heated pool, tennis, paddle tennis, athletics, football, basketball, etc.
 North Zone: heated pool, football, basketball and tennis.
 Abulense Casino Club: pools, golf, tennis, paddle, cafeteria, restaurant, football, skating, basketball etc.
 Naturávila: golf, swimming, horse riding, walking, basketball, paddle tennis, football.
 San Antonio Sports Hall: in the north of the town is a large covered pavilion with basketball courts, tennis, soccer, squash, climbing.
 Polideportivo Carlos Sastre, on the outskirts of the town. Its inauguration took place on January 30, 2009, with a friendly match between Óbila Club de Basket of LEB Plata and LEB Oro C.B. León. It has basketball courts, soccer, tennis, volleyball, etc.

Sports teams
The town is home to Óbila CB, a professional basketball team of Spain's LEB Plata. The team plays its home games at the Multiusos Carlos Sastre.

The local football team, Real Ávila CF, plays at the Adolfo Suárez Stadium, owned by the municipality.

Popular celebrations

The first public festival after the winter cold is the Holy week. The temperature is cold, especially at night, so one should not forget warm clothes.

Ávila holidays are October 15, Santa Teresa de Jesús, and May 2, San Segundo. The festivities take place around October 15 and the Summer Festival in mid-July.

Holy Week
Holy Week as celebrated in Ávila is considered of international tourist interest.  It is one of the highest expressions of art and wealth as seen in numerous steps of Holy Week along the town walls. Processions have either or fifteen or twelve fraternities.

Fiestas de Santa Teresa

The festivities of Santa Teresa last almost the entire month of October. The proclamation is done by the mayor in the Plaza Mayor, accompanied by some celebrity. After the proclamation was organized in the same place a musical performance with renowned singers.

The festival program includes several musical concerts, a fairground, bullfights, passacaglia, processions of the fan groups, chocolate with churros and liturgical acts naturally focus on the day of the patroness, on 15 October with multitudinous mass presided by Bishop, then celebrated a great procession, headed the image of Santa Teresa with the Virgin of La Caridad, and is accompanied by all the authorities of Ávila, civil and military, and several bands music. The procession takes place between the Cathedral of Ávila and Santa Teresa Church. Takes place the day before the "Procession Girl" from the Iglesian de Santa Teresa to the cathedral.

Cuisine

Typical dishes of the town and region are "Judías del Barco", "Chuletón de Ávila", "Patatas revolconas" and "Yemas de Santa Teresa". Also worth mentioning is "Hornazo", "Bun stuffed with sausage, bacon, steak and eggs", "Mollejas de ternera" or the "Cochinillo",  which can be found in the capital and in Arévalo.

Yemas de Santa Teresa
This sweet can always be found in the traditional pastry shop  "La Flor de Castilla". In the other bakeries in the town it is produced under the name "Yemas de Ávila", or simply "Yemas", produced as its name indicates from egg yolk.

Chuletón de Ávila
This is a grilled ribeye steak, best cooked rare, which can be enjoyed in any hotel in the town. It is made from Avileña-Negra ibérica, an indigenous black cow known for its excellent meat, whose fame transcends the borders of the province and the country.

Twin towns – sister cities

Ávila is twinned with:

 Guanajuato, Guanajuato, Mexico
 Rhodes, Rhodes Island, Greece
 Rueil-Malmaison, Île-de-France, France
 Teramo, Abruzzo, Italy
 Villeneuve-sur-Lot, Nouvelle-Aquitaine, France

Transport 

The Ávila Railway Station serves the town. The closest airport is Adolfo Suárez in Madrid-Barajas. The city can be reached via the A-6 from Madrid. The city itself can be explored on foot.

See also
List of people from Ávila, Spain
Kingdom of Castile
Old Castile

References

Further reading
  (Lives of five famous people of the province of Avila, Spain, in the 15th, 16th, and 17th centuries: Isabel the Catholic, St Teresa of Ávila, St John of the Cross, María Vela and San Pedro Bautista)

External links

 
 Avila's Town Hall
 Avila's Tourist Guide
 Convent of St. Teresa, Ávila
 Ávila in the official website for Tourism in Spain (in English)
 Photos of Ávila
 Satellite picture by Google Maps
 Hazlitt, Classical Gazetteer "Abila"
 Citizens' association for the defence of heritage of Ávila - Photos of Ávila

 
Municipalities in the Province of Ávila
World Heritage Sites in Spain
Province of Ávila
Cultural tourism in Spain